The 2019 Supercopa de España de Baloncesto, also known as Supercopa Endesa for sponsorship reasons, was the 16th edition of the Supercopa de España de Baloncesto, an annual basketball competition for clubs in the Spanish basketball league system that were successful in its major competitions in the preceding season. Real Madrid defended successfully the title and conquered its second consecutive Supercup, 6th overall.

The final between Real Madrid and Barça beat the record attendance for a supercup match with 12,348 spectators. Also, the tournament beat the accumulated attendance record for a supercup edition with 35,219 accumulated spectators after three games (11,740 spectators per game).

All times were in Central European Summer Time (UTC+02:00).

Qualification 
The tournament featured the host team, the winners from the two major competitions (2018–19 Liga Endesa and 2019 Copa del Rey) and the winner from the 2018–19 EuroCup.

Qualified teams 
The following four teams qualified for the tournament.

Venue 
On July 24, 2018, ACB selected and announced Madrid to host the supercup on September 2019. The former building, which was built in 1960, was destroyed by a fire in 2001. Architects Enrique Hermoso and Paloma Huidobro projected a High-Tech style new arena that was built at the same location between 2002 and 2005. The arena hosted two major international basketball events in the first decade of the 21st century - the knockout stage of EuroBasket 2007 and the 2008 Euroleague Final Four. It also hosted the final stage of the Copa del Rey of basketball in 2006, 2009, 2011 and 2019. The arena was the finals venue for the 2014 World Cup and the 2015 Euroleague Final Four.

Draw 
The draw was held on 2 September 2020 in Madrid, Spain. Real Madrid as the league champion and Barça as cup champion were the seeded teams.

Bracket

Semifinals

Barça vs. Valencia Basket

Real Madrid vs. Montakit Fuenlabrada

Final

References

External links 
 Official website 

Supercopa de España de Baloncesto
2019–20 in Spanish basketball
September 2019 sports events in Spain
2019 in Madrid